The San Diego Surf are a semi-professional basketball team in the American Basketball Association (ABA) based in San Diego, California which began play in 2009. The Surf is a member of the ABA's Far West division and its home arena is the HourGlass Arena at Miramar College in San Diego.

History

Before the formation of the San Diego Surf, the city's ABA team had been the San Diego Wildcats, who stopped playing in 2009. The San Diego Surf was formed and held its first tryouts later that year under head coach Terry Mason, and began playing in late 2009. The team has a rivalry with the San Diego Sol.

2009-10 season
The Surf finished their season on a positive note participating in the benefit games for the 80,000 victims of the devastating earthquake in Chengdu, China 2008 against the Beijing Aoshen Olympians in Chengdu, Sichuan, China and the first game of ABA Global's ABA Friendship Games 2010 against the Philippine National Pro Basketball team, Smart Gilas, in San Diego April 2010.

2010-11 season
The Surf began their short exhibition season against the Camp Pendleton Marines on October 21 at Hourglass Arena. San Diego won 97–73. They opened up their regular season with a 140–123 win over the San Francisco Rumble, who were ranked #3 in the preseason power rankings.

2019-20 
The Surf played 15 games in the season.

Notable players 

 Glen Dandridge
 Michael Gomez

References

External links

Defunct American Basketball Association (2000–present) teams
Basketball teams in San Diego
Basketball teams established in 2009
2009 establishments in California